Nicholas Periclies Voutsinas (born September 6, 1994), known professionally as Fat Nick, is an American rapper from Miami, Florida. Initially rising to prominence alongside American rapper Pouya and their collective Buffet Boys, he is known for being a leading and important figure of the SoundCloud underground rap scene that began in 2012.

Career

In February 2017, he released a collaborative album with frequent collaborator Pouya titled Drop Out Of School. In July 2017, he performed at  a launch party for the documentary Next Wave alongside Lil Tracy and special guests Lil Peep and Joey Purp. In June 2018, he released his album Generation Numb with appearances from Blackbear, OhGeesy, and Bexey. In December 2020, Fat Nick released his collaboration album with 
Pouya titled Drop Out of School 2, the sequel to their 2017 album. In November 2021, he released his album Gorgeous Glizzy Gordo with appearances from Maxo Kream, Shakewell, SosMula, Robb Banks, Ramirez, and Lil Jerry.

Personal life
Voutsinas has been open about his addiction to opiates since beginning his career in 2012, and started using heavy narcotics in 2013 as a way to battle with Anxiety. Also in November 2021, he opened up about his history of drug abuse. Since October 2021, Voutsinas said he has been going sober, and states that the death of close friend and rapper Lil Peep made him want to quit using drugs.

Controversies

Drug Promotion
In September 2018, Voutsinas was accused by American rapper Russ of financially exploiting drug abuse during an interview on the Breakfast Club. Fat Nick responded by apologizing to his fans on Twitter. In October 2018, he was accused by Lil Tracy, a friend and frequent collaborator of the late rapper Lil Peep, of fueling the latter's drug addiction by providing him illicit substances for his 21st birthday.

Discography

Studio albums

Extended plays 

 Roommates (2019) (w/ Shakewell)
 Drop Out of School 2 (2020) (w/ Pouya)

Mixtapes 

 Buffet Boys (2013)
 Tha Heart Attack (2014)
 Fat Camp (2015)
 When the Lean Runs Out (2016)
 Drop Out of School (2017) (w/ Pouya)
 All But 6 (2023) (w/ All But 6 & Pouya)

Singles

References 

Living people
21st-century American rappers
1994 births
People from Miami
Rappers from Miami